The Book of Jin is an official Chinese historical text covering the history of the Jin dynasty from 266 to 420. It was compiled in 648 by a number of officials commissioned by the imperial court of the Tang dynasty, with chancellor Fang Xuanling as the lead editor, drawing mostly from official documents left from earlier archives. A few essays in volumes 1, 3, 54 and 80 were composed by the Tang dynasty's Emperor Taizong himself. However, the contents of the Book of Jin included not only the history of the Jin dynasty, but also that of the Sixteen Kingdoms period, which was contemporaneous with the Eastern Jin dynasty.

Compilation
Over 20 histories of the Jin had been written during the Northern and Southern dynasties, of which 18 were still extant at the beginning of the Tang dynasty. Yet Emperor Taizong deemed them all to be deficient and ordered the compilation of a new standard history for the period, as part of a wider six-history project to fill in the gaps between the Records of the Three Kingdoms, the Book of Song, the Book of Qi, the Book of Wei and the Emperor's own time. As part of this ambition, its treatises cover not only the Jin but also the preceding Three Kingdoms, making up for the lack of such a section in the Records of the Three Kingdoms.

The book was hastily compiled between 646 CE and 648, by a committee of 21 people led by editor-in-chief Fang Xuanling. As some chapters were written by Emperor Taizong of Tang, the work is sometimes given the honorific "imperially authored".

The Book of Jin had the longest gestation period of any official history, not seeing the light of day until 229 years after the end of the dynasty it describes.

Contents

Annals (紀)

Treatises (志)

Biographies (列傳)

Records (載記)

Legacy
The book has been criticized for being more reflective of the court politics in the Tang dynasty that compiled it, rather than the realities of the Jin dynasty itself.

Despite Fang's team having at their disposal not only the pre-existing Jin histories, but also a large body of actual Jin primary sources, it appears that the book was primarily based on Zang Rongxu's (臧荣绪) identically-titled Jinshu from the Southern Qi, and further incorporates material from fictionalized novels. The Tang historian Liu Zhiji (661–721) accused the editors of generally selecting the sources that had the most vivid and compelling language, rather than the ones that were the most historically reliable.

The collaborative nature of the project coupled with the rushed production time unsurprisingly leaves the book with a number of internal contradictions and editorial errors; such as misspelled personal and place names, draft-like and unpolished language, and "cross-references" to non-existent chapters that were presumably planned but never finished in time for publication.

In spite of these shortcomings, the Book of Jin is recognized as the most important primary source for the Jin dynasty and Sixteen Kingdoms, because the pre-existing histories and other sources it was compiled from have all been lost – save for a few stray quotations in other works.

Translations
No complete translations are known at this time. The astronomical chapters (11, 12 & 13) were translated by Ho Peng Yoke. Choo translates the biography of Huan Wen in volume 98 and the biography of Sun Chuo in volume 56. Knapp translates biographies of Liu Yin in volume 88 and Huangfu Mi in volume 51.

References

External links 

 Book of Jin 《晉書》 Chinese text with matching English vocabulary

See also 
 Twenty-Four Histories
 Eighteen History Books of Jin

Twenty-Four Histories
History books about the Jin dynasty (266–420)
Sixteen Kingdoms
7th-century history books
Tang dynasty literature
7th-century Chinese books